Blotiella is a genus of ferns in the family Dennstaedtiaceae described as a genus in 1962. The genus was named in honor of Marie Laure Tardieu-Blot (1902–1998), who was a French pteridologist. 

It was first published in Contr. Gray Herb. vol.191 on page 96 in 1962 by Rolla Milton Tryon.

Species
As accepted by Kew;
  - Rwanda to Burundi
  - western tropical Africa
  - Tanzania
  - Madagascar
  - Uganda to Angola
  - central Africa
  - Madagascar, E + S Africa
  - Kenya, Tanzania
  - Madagascar
  - Madagascar
  - Central - South America
  - Madagascar
  - Cameroon
  - Madagascar
  - E + SE + S Africa, Madagascar, Mauritius, Comoros
  - Madagascar
  - Madagascar, tropical Africa
  - Zambia
  - Kenya, Tanzania
  - Cameroon, Gabon, Central African Republic
  - Burundi, Uganda, Tanzania

References

Dennstaedtiaceae
Fern genera